Iravivarman Thampi, better known as Irayimman Thampi (1782 October 12 – 1856 July 29), was an Indian Carnatic musician, music composer and poet from the Kingdom of Travancore. He was a vocalist in the court of Swathi Thirunal. His compositions include the lullaby Omanathinkal Kidavo, one of the most popular lullabies in Malayalam.

Biography 
Irayimman Thampi, named Iravivarman Thampi after his grandfather, was born in 1782 at Kottakkakom Kizhake Madom, in Karamana, Travancore to Kerala Varma Thampuran, of the royal family of Cherthala, and Parvathi Pillai Thankachi of the Puthumana Ammaveedu Thampi family, the daughter of Prince Makayiram Thirunal Ravi Varma and niece of the Maharajah Dharma Raja of Travancore royal family. Thampi was brought up by his parents at a house called Kizhake Madom and after early education from his father, he went under the tutorship of Shankaran Elayathu in grammar, linguistics and Sanskrit literature. He dedicated his first poem, written at the age of 14, to Karthika Thirunal Dharma Raja of Travancore which earned him a notable position in the Travancore court, enjoying the patronage of four kings viz. Dharmaraja, Balarama Varma, Swathi Thirunal and Uthram Thirunal as well as two queens, Gouri Parvathy Bai and Gouri Lakshmi Bai.

Irayiman Thampi was married Kali Pillai Thankachi, daughter of his maternal uncle Puthumana Krishnan Thampi, and the couple had had seven children including a daughter, Lakshmi Kutty Pillai Thankachi, better known as Kutty Kunju Thankachi (1820–1914), who continued her father's artistic and poetic legacy. Another daughter of Thampi was married to Sri Narayanan Thampi of Arumana, son of Maharajah Visakham Thirunal. Irayimman Thampi was already thirty one years of age when Swathi Thirunal was born, but outlived him for a decade. It was for putting Swathi Thirunal to sleep, when he was a baby, Irayimman Thampi wrote the lullaby Omanathinkal Kidavo, which went on to become one of the most popular lullabies in Malayalam language.

Thampi is believed to have died in 1856.

Contributions 
Thampi's contributions range from attakathas, kirtanas, varnas and padams, and has been published as books.

Verses and songs 

 Kichakavatham Attakatha
 Utharaswayamvaram Attakatha
 Dakshayagam Attakatha
 Subhadraharanam Kaikottikalippattu
 Murajapa Pana
 Navarathri prabandham
 Omanathinkal Kidavo - set in Rāga Neelambari
 Vasishtam killippattu
 Rasakrida
 Rajasevakramam Manipravalam
 Somapoma - set in Rāga Saveri
 Adimalar - set in Rāga Mukhari

Kirtanas 

 Neelavarna pahimam (surutti - chempata)
 Pāhimām giritanayē - Rāga Saveri - miśra cāpu
 Karuna Cheyvan - set in Shree ragam (Later made in Yadukula Kamboji by Chembai Vaidyanatha Bhagavathar)
 Adimalarinnathanne (Mukhari - chempata)
 Nityamāśrayē - rītigauḷa - Adi tala

Varnams 

 Ambā gauri girikanyē - stava varNam - Ārabhi
 Manasi parithapam dussaham ayyo (Sankarabharanam - chempata)

Padams 

 Aroducholvan Azhalullathellam (indisa - Jhampa)
 Kamaladikalam Narumalarellam (Kamodari - chempata)
 Enthujnanihacheyvu (Neelambari - chempata)
 Prananathanenikkunalkiya (Kamodari - chempata)

Notes

References

External links
 
 

Writers from Thiruvananthapuram
People of the Kingdom of Travancore
Malayali people
Musicians from Thiruvananthapuram
Malayalam-language writers
Carnatic composers
1856 deaths
1781 births
Musicians from Kerala
Indian male classical musicians
Indian male composers
19th-century Indian composers
18th-century Indian composers
19th-century male musicians